Jan Gysbert Hermanus du Preez (born 6 October 1930) is a former South African rugby union player who made one Test match appearance in 1956.

Playing career
Du Preez was born in Piketberg and received his schooling at Piketberg High School. He then enrolled at Stellenbosch University to study for a BSc degree and later gained a doctorate in chemistry. 

While a student, du Preez began playing provincial rugby for Western Province as a centre, before moving to the wing. His only Test appearance for South Africa came on the 1956 tour of Australia and New Zealand. He was selected to play in the first Test against the All Blacks at Carisbrook, Dunedin—a match that South Africa lost 10–6.

Test history

See also
List of South Africa national rugby union players – Springbok no. 327

References

External links 
Scrum profile

1930 births
Living people
People from Bergrivier Local Municipality
White South African people
South African rugby union players
South Africa international rugby union players
Stellenbosch University alumni
Rugby union players from the Western Cape
Rugby union wings
Western Province (rugby union) players